A military reserve, active reserve, reserve formation, or simply reserve, is a group of military personnel or units that is initially not committed to a battle by its commander, so that it remains available to address unforeseen situations or exploit sudden opportunities. Such a force may be held back to defend against attack from other enemy forces, to be committed to the existing battle if the enemy exposes a vulnerability, or to serve as relief for troops already fighting. Some of the different categories of military reserves are: tactical reserve, operational reserve, and strategic reserve.

A military reserve is different from a military reserve force, which is a military organization composed of military personnel who maintain their military skills and readiness in a long-term part-time commitment to support their country if needed. Military reserve refers to specific trained pre-organized forces operating on an on-call basis from the main military force. Each member acts in combat as a regular soldier.

Reserves at various levels
In the modern battlefield, reserves exist at all levels, from a platoon held back from a company level engagement, to whole army corps consisting of armoured and mechanised divisions which are held in reserve with the purpose of exploiting a breakthrough or containing an enemy advance. Typically what is a reserve for one headquarters is not the reserve for a higher headquarters (though depending on the setup they may be). So if one of a battalion's companies is held in reserve during a battle, the company is considered to be a reserve for the battalion but not for the brigade or the division, since it is committed to action in its parent battalion sector. Similarly the British Reserve Army of World War I and the American Fifteenth Army of World War II were only reserves in their theater, as far as the national Headquarters was concerned, they were committed since they were not available to be sent for action in any other theater.

Employment
Deciding when, where, and how to employ reserves is one of the most important choices a commander makes. Usually only a part of the reserves are utilised at any given time, since these are often sufficient to accomplish the task at hand. Committing the entire reserve at once - the "all reserves forward" order - is only considered in moments of extreme crisis, when it is clear the enemy will not be stopped otherwise. In the event of reserves being sent forward to exploit a breakthrough, some are typically held back to deal with a potential  counterattack. Reserves can also be employed to relieve troops in action, allowing those units to rest and regroup away from the front line.

Reserves may also exist in a broader sense: instead of being designated as the reserve in one tactical area, units and formations may be held back as forces available for responding to new strategic situations, or for fighting a decisive battle, as the battleship Yamato was.

Effect of reserves in history
Reserve troops—or lack thereof—have played a significant role in battles and campaigns throughout history, especially in the twentieth century. Nazi Germany deployed reserves from France and southern Europe to Tunisia, averting collapse in the wake of Operation Torch, and later to Italy, assuming control over most of that country after the Allied landing and the Italian surrender. Conversely, the lack of reserves to deal with the Allied landings in Sicily compelled the Germans to shift forces away from the Eastern Front, hampering the 1943 Kursk offensive, and the expenditure of their last reserves in the Battle of the Bulge contributed heavily to the general German collapse in 1945.

In the aftermath of World War I, the extensive colonial commitments of the United Kingdom left few battalions available for the Anglo-Irish War, which hindered the British ability to deal with the crisis.

At the Battle of Gaugamela, Alexander the Great held back his cavalry, using it first to deal with Persian flanking movements and later to exploit a gap in the enemy line and win the battle.

Example of reserves
There have been many examples of reserves formations throughout history.

British Reserve Army in World War I
The Reserve Army was a field army of the British Expeditionary Force during the First World War. Under the command of Lieutenant General Sir Hubert Gough, the Reserve Army was formed on 23 May 1916, prior to the Battle of the Somme, and was renamed the Fifth Army in October of that year.

The intended purpose of the army was to carry out the breakthrough phase of the Somme offensive once General Sir Henry Rawlinson's Fourth Army had captured the German front-line trenches. For this role Gough was provided with the three British cavalry divisions and in June he was allocated an infantry corps of three divisions to support the advance.

Strike Corps
Some armor heavy formations of India and Pakistan are designated as "strike corps" to take advantage of breakthroughs.

See also
 National guard

References

Further reading

Reserve
Attrition warfare